Nuntita Khampiranon (born December 20, 1983), or nickname Art (อาร์ต), stage name Bell (เบลล์) and usually known as Bell Nuntita, is a Thai transgender actress, singer, entertainer, and radio DJ. Nuntita was part of a TV show called Venus Flytrap Search for the Missing Puzzle in 2007. As one of twelve contestants, she competed to take the place of two former cast members. Nuntita and another contestant named Mew won the competition and became part of the Kathoey band Venus Flytrap. She became popular after a performance during her audition on Thailand's Got Talent and became a YouTube hit when she first performed singing as a girl, and the crowd was amazed when she switched to a masculine voice.

Personal life
Although transsexuality is fairly well-accepted in Thailand, life as Bell was not exactly easy. In a Thai TV interview, she said it was very difficult to explain her gender identity to her family. As the only child of a military father, she faced many challenges to be accepted. However, today her family has accepted her and she is happy.

She has absolute pitch.

Thailand's Got Talent
Nuntita was convinced to audition for Thailand's Got Talent by Anucha "Chi" Lanprasert, a talent scout. It was Nuntita's idea to surprise the crowd by first singing in a middleweight contralto voice before switching to a masculine baritone midway through the audition. In an April episode of the show, the judges picked Nuntita to be one of 48 semi-finalists. She received the second most votes in the semi-final round, and was thus subject to the three judges' determining votes. She passed to the final round by receiving "yes" votes from two of the three judges. Her first remixed song on the show's audition stage was a combination of "Yahk Roo Tae Mai Yahk Taam" by Calories Blah Blah and "Unlovable" by MILD, two popular Thai tunes. The three-minute song displayed Nuntita's choice of song style, mixing different genres and vocal ranges. After Nuntita's audition video appeared on YouTube and other sites, the video quickly went viral. She is sometimes dubbed as Thailand's version of Scottish singer Susan Boyle.

Nuntita appeared on multiple Thai talk shows and had many nationally televised performances. She has appeared in TV shows such as Mum Show hosted by Petchtai Wongkamlao where she spoke of her gender transition. She said she participated in the army conscription lottery but did not draw the commission to enlist in Thailand's army. Nuntita also performed the full versions of "Yahk Roo Tae Mai Yahk Taam" and "Unloveable" at a promotional event for Miss Tiffany Universe, Thailand's transsexual beauty pageant. TV shows and other publicity outlets commonly interviewed her about her reaction to the sudden fame. Bell was also featured on the front cover of Who Weekly Magazine. In July 2011, she held a one-night concert for her fans in Singapore.

Discography

Filmography

Film

References

External links 
 Official site
 Official blog

1983 births
Got Talent contestants
Bell Nuntita
Living people
Bell Nuntita
Bell Nuntita
Bell Nuntita
Bell Nuntita
Bell Nuntita
Contraltos
Baritones
LGBT DJs
Transgender singers
Transgender women musicians
Sony BMG artists
21st-century LGBT people
Transgender women
Transgender actresses